Temi Harriman (born 1 January 1963) is a Nigerian lawyer, politician, and member House of Representatives, National Assembly representing Warri Federal Constituency under the umbrella of the All Peoples Party (APP).

Early life and career 

She was a member in the House of Representatives for Warri Federal Constituency under the All Peoples Party APP from 1999 to 2003. and maintained her seat for another tenure from 2003 to 2007.

References 

1963 births
Living people
21st-century Nigerian politicians
21st-century Nigerian women politicians